Jason Huang, M.D., FACS is a Chinese-born American neurosurgeon at Baylor Scott & White Health in Temple, Texas. He is known for both clinical and research work in nervous system injury and repair, including traumatic brain injury, spinal trauma, and peripheral nerve injuries. He is the recipient of "U.S. News Top Docs".

Early life
Huang was born in Shanghai, China.

Education
Huang graduated from Amherst College, and received his medical degree from Johns Hopkins University School of Medicine. Following that, he finished neurosurgery residency training at University of Pennsylvania. During his residency training, he also completed his Neurotrauma & Critical Care and Complex Spine fellowships at University of Pennsylvania.

Professional career
In 2006, Huang joined Strong Memorial Hospital and Highland Hospital in Rochester, NY as an attending neurosurgeon. During this time, he was deployed to Balad Theater Hospital in Iraq in 2008 in support of Operation Iraqi Freedom. 

In 2012, he received an Army Commendation Medal and was honorably discharged at the rank of lieutenant colonel.

In 2014, Huang joined the faculty at Baylor Scott & White Health to become the director of the neuroscience institute and chairman of the neurosurgery department. He was appointed Professor of Surgery at Texas A&M University College of Medicine. He also successfully built up an ACGME-accredited residency training program, for which he serves as the program director.

Positions
Reviewer at several NIH Study Sections
Reviewer at Department of Defense
Reviewer at Department of Veteran Affairs Research Grants
Board member of New York State Spinal Cord Injury Research Board (2007-2014)
Advisory Board of the journal Spine
Guest editor on Traumatic Brain Injury for Neurological Research
Reviewer for Neurosurgery, Neurology, Spine, and The Science of Nature, etc.

Research
Huang's main research interest lies in the field of nervous system injury and repair. His lab has active extramural research funding including a prestigious R01 award from the National Institutes of Health.

Publications
Wang F., Wang X., Shapiro L.A., Cotrina, M.L., Liu, W., Wang, E.W., Gu, S., Wang, W., He, X., Nedergaard, M., Huang, J.H.: NKCC1 up-regulation Contributes to Early Post-traumatic Seizures and Increased Post-traumatic Seizure Susceptibility. Brain Struct. Funct. Sep 1, 2016 [Epub ahead of print] .
Sone, J.Y., Kondziolka D., Huang, J.H., Samadani, U.: Helmet Efficacy against Concussion and Traumatic Brain Injury: A Literature Review, Journal of Neurosurgery, May 27:1-14, 2016, [Epub ahead of print]. .
Dayawansa, S. Zhang, J., Tharakan, B., Huang, J.H.: Functional, electrophysiological recoveries of rats with sciatic nerve lesions following transplantation of elongated DRG cells, Neurological Research, 2016, March 28:1-6. [Epub ahead of print]. .
Song, F., Hou Y., Sun G., Chen X., Xu, B., Huang, J.H., Zhang, J.: In vivo Visualization of the Facial Nerve in Acoustic Neuroma using Diffusion Tensor Imaging-Based Fiber Tracking, Journal of Neurosurgery, Jan 1:1-8, 2016 [Epub ahead of print]. .
Samadani U., Farooq S., Ritlop, R., Warren, F., Reyes, M., Lamm, E., Alex, A., Nehrbass, E., Kolecki, R., Jureller, M., Schneider, J., Chen, A., Shi, C., Mendhiratta N., Huang, J.H., Qian, M., Kwak, R., Mikheev, A., Rusinek, H., George, A., Fergus, R., Kondziolka, D., Huang, P.P., Smith, R.T.: Detection of Third and Sixth Cranial Nerve Palsies with a Novel Method of Eye Tracking While Watching a Short Film Clip, Journal of Neurosurgery, 122(3): 707-720, March 2015. .
Lynch, G., Nieto, K., Puthenveettil, S., Reyes, M., Jureller, M., Huang, J.H., Grady, M.S., Harris, O.A., Ganju, A., Germano, I., Pilitsis, J., Benzil, D. Abosch A., and Samadani, U.: Attrition Rates in Neurosurgery Residency: Analysis of 1361 Consecutive Residents Matched from 1990 to 1999, Journal of Neurosurgery, 122(2): 240–249, Feb 2015. .
Tong, J., Ren, Y., Wang, X., Dimopoulos V.G., Kesler, H.N., Liu, W., Nedergaard, M., Huang, J.H.: Assessment of NgR1 Function in vivo after Spinal Cord Injury, Neurosurgery, 2014 July; 75(1):51-60. .
Plog, B.A., Pierre C.A., Srinivasan V., Srinivasan, K., Petraglia, A.L., Huang, J.H.: Neurologic Injury in Snowmobiling, Surgical Neurology International, 5:87, June 6, 2014. .
Srinivasan V., Pierre C., Plog, B., Srinivasan, K., Petraglia, A.L., Huang, J.H.: Straight from the Horse's Mouth: Neurological Injury in Equestrian Sports, Neurological Research, 36(10): 873–877, 2014. .
Dayawansa, S., Wang, EW, Liu, W., Markman, JD, Gelbard, HA, Huang, J.H.: Allotransplanted DRG Neurons or Schwann Cells Affect Functional Recovery in a Rodent Model of Sciatic Nerve Injury. Neurological Research, 36(11):1020-1027, Nov 2014. .

Patents
Huang holds six U.S. patents.

References

External links
Baylor Scott & White Health
U.S. News
ResearchGate
Killeen Daily Herald

American neurosurgeons
Living people
Year of birth missing (living people)
American people of Chinese descent